Raquette Lake is the source of the Raquette River in the Adirondack Mountains of New York State. It is near the community of Raquette Lake, New York. The lake has  of shoreline with pines and mountains bordering the lake. It is located in the towns of Long Lake and Arietta, both in Hamilton County.

Raquette Lake is popular, especially in summer, due to the scenery, wildlife, boating and hiking. There are several children's summer camps, including Raquette Lake Boys Camp and Raquette Lake Girls Camp. In winter, substantial snowfall makes the area popular for snowmobiling, cross-country skiing, and snowshoeing. The lake is also part of the 740-mile Northern Forest Canoe Trail, which begins in Old Forge, NY and ends in Fort Kent, ME.

History
The origin of the name is uncertain. One account is that it was named for snowshoes (raquette in French) left by a party of Tories led by Sir John Johnson in 1776. Traveling by snowshoe, they were overtaken by a spring thaw when they reached the lake. They left the snowshoes en masse on the shore.

Raquette Lake developed into one of the most prestigious summer getaways for the elite in the 19th century.  In 1877, William West Durant started work on what would become the first of the "Great Camps," Pine Knot.  Other summer homes in the "great camp style" on Raquette Lake include North Point (the 1870 buildings replaced by Lucy Carnegie in 1903), Echo Camp (1883) and Bluff Point (1876).

Raquette Lake served as a midpoint to other Gilded Age retreats such as the Great Camps Sagamore (1897; now a National Historic Landmark), Camp Uncas (1890; became a National Historic Landmark in fall 2008), and Kamp Kill Kare (1896) on nearby lakes Sagamore, Mohegan, and Kora, respectively. Sagamore is open to the public for guided tours during non-winter months and also as an educational facility.

Bluff Point and William West Durant
Bluff Point is still a private camp and run much as it was over 100 years ago. It was built by Francis Stott of Stottville, New York, at the suggestion of Dr. Thomas C. Durant.  Durant and Mrs. Stott's family had briefly been in business together as Durant, Lathrop & Co. in Albany, New York, during the 1840s. When Bluff Point was sold to magazine publisher Robert Collier in 1905, most of the original structures were modified and expanded into the present score of buildings — the huge walk-in fireplace, the bowling alley, the bridge to the gazebo, etc.

Pine Knot and William West Durant

Pine Knot, Uncas and Sagamore were designed using natural materials native to the Adirondacks by William West Durant, the son of Thomas C. Durant. The senior Durant was most famous for the building the eastern half of the Transcontinental Railroad. The first of these "Great Camps"  was Camp Pine Knot, started by Thomas and taken over by William in 1879.  The construction continued through 1890. This artistic camp was used by W.W. Durant as a showcase, as he wined and dined railroad tycoons, selling them on the idea of his building a camp for each of them.

In 1895 W.W. Durant sold the camp to Collis P. Huntington (builder of the western half of the Transcontinental Railroad) in partial repayment of a debt. In 1949 Archer Huntington gave the camp to SUNY Cortland, to be used for education and never to be turned over to the state. In 1938, the family provided the land for the Raquette Lake Chapel in the village for $1.

William West Durant also provided the funding for two summer chapels on Raquette Lake, accessible only by water. The Church of the Good Shepherd (1880) and St. William's Catholic Church on Long Point (1890) were each designed by J. Cleaveland Cady of Cady, Berg & See, New York City.

See also
Joe Bryere

Sources
Donaldson, Alfred L., A History of the Adirondacks.  New York: Century, 1921.  . (reprint)

External links

St. Hubert's Isle - History of Raquette Lake

Lakes of New York (state)
Lakes of Hamilton County, New York
Tourist attractions in Hamilton County, New York
Adirondack Great Camps
Northern Forest Canoe Trail